The Mighty Canadian Minebuster (often shortened to Minebuster) is a wooden roller coaster located at Canada's Wonderland amusement park in Vaughan, Ontario, Canada.

History

Mighty Canadian Minebuster was one of five roller coasters to debut at the park's grand opening on May 23, 1981. It is also modeled after Shooting Star, a roller coaster that used to exist at Coney Island amusement park in Cincinnati, Ohio. It was originally intended to be the centrepiece of a themed area called Frontier Canada, but the idea for the section was abandoned – the section was later built for the 2019 season.

Minebuster is an out and back roller coaster designed by Curtis D. Summers and built in-house. The roller coaster was not built by PTC, despite a plaque at the operator's booth and several published reports that claim it was. PTC stopped building coasters in 1979. It is likely however, that the construction crew consisted of workers who had previously built coasters for PTC. The two, 30-passenger trains were supplied by the Philadelphia Toboggan Coasters. Canada's Wonderland's water park, Splash Works, has four sets of slides that pass over Minebuster.

Ride layout
Minebuster will be familiar to most coaster riders as a modified out and back wooden coaster, specifically with the addition of an upward spiraling helix at the end as the most obvious modification to the traditional out and back layout. The riders make an immediate U-turn to the left after leaving the station, past the storage depot and head up the chain lift hill. At the crest of the lift, the train makes a very small drop and turns right for the big drop. Riders then go through two negative-G hills and pass under a waterslide before climbing up a larger hill and making a turnaround to the right. The ride then drops down and rushes over three smaller hills before entering a banked turn to the left. For a finale, riders roar through a helix inside a tunnel before entering the brake run which stops the train.

References

External links
 
 

Roller coasters introduced in 1981
Roller coasters in Ontario
Roller coasters operated by Cedar Fair